A Small Ball Shot by a Midget is a 1981 South Korean film by Lee Won-se based on the same-titled novel by Cho Se-hui. It is about a dwarf and his poor, but loving, family who are forced out of their house by a real estate agent.

Cast
Jeon Yang-ja
 Ahn Sung-ki
Kim Choo-ryeon
Geum Bo-ra
Jeon Young-sun
Lee Hyo-jung
Kim Bul-i
Chu Seok-yang
Sung Moung-sun
Choe Seok

External links
 
 
 LoveHKFilm review

South Korean drama films
1981 films
Films based on South Korean novels
1981 drama films